Louisa County Airport , also known as Freeman Field, is a public use airport located two nautical miles (4 km) southeast of the central business district of Louisa, a town in Louisa County, Virginia, United States. Although most U.S. airports use the same three-letter location identifier for the FAA and IATA, this airport is assigned LKU by the FAA and LOW by the IATA.

Facilities and aircraft 
It has one asphalt paved runway designated 9/27 which measures 4,301 by 100 feet (1,311 x 30 m). There is a full-service FBO, Cavalier Aviation, LLC, on-site, with fuel and maintenance. For the 12-month period ending May 30, 2008, the airport had 20,987 aircraft operations, an average of 57 per day: 96% general aviation, 2% air taxi and 2% military.

Events 
Louisa County Airport hosts several events throughout the year featuring airplane rides and introductory flight lessons.

References

External links 
 

Airports in Virginia
Buildings and structures in Louisa County, Virginia
Louisa, Virginia
Transportation in Louisa County, Virginia